Purple milkvetch or purple milk-vetch is a common name for several plants and may refer to:

Astragalus agrestis, native to North America
Astragalus danicus, native to Europe